French Laotian or Laotian French may refer to:
France–Laos relations
French Laos and people or events pertaining thereto
French people in Laos
Laotians in France
People with dual citizenship of France and Laos
Eurasian (mixed ancestry) people of French and Laotian descent